Entranceway at Main Street at Darwin Drive is a suburban residential subdivision entranceway and street furniture built about 1927 by developer Charles S. Burkhardt.  It is located on Main Street (New York State Route 5) in the town of Amherst within Erie County.  It consists of two matching sets of stone sculptures set on either side of the drive.  It also includes the painted metal street sign post.

It was added to the National Register of Historic Places in 2009.

See also
Entranceway at Main Street at High Park Boulevard

References

Buildings and structures on the National Register of Historic Places in New York (state)
Buildings and structures completed in 1927
Buildings and structures in Erie County, New York
National Register of Historic Places in Erie County, New York